The Passo della Limina is a mountain pass in Calabria, southern Italy. It marks the natural boundary between the Aspromonte and the Serre Calabresi massifs.

It has an altitude of 822 m.

Limina
Landforms of Calabria
Limina